The 1991 Toronto Argonauts season was the 102nd season for the team since the franchise's inception in 1873. The team finished in first place in the East Division with a 13–5 record and qualified for the playoffs for the sixth consecutive year. The Argonauts defeated the Winnipeg Blue Bombers in the Eastern Final and qualified for the 79th Grey Cup. Toronto defeated the Calgary Stampeders in a rematch of the 1971 Grey Cup, winning their 12th Grey Cup championship by a score of 36-21.

Offseason
In February 1991, the Argonauts were purchased by Bruce McNall, Wayne Gretzky and John Candy. In April 1991, the Argonauts signed Raghib Ismail to a four-year contract worth 18 million dollars. The Ismail signing included four million dollars upfront. Technically, Ismail was only being paid $110,000 a season to play football. The rest was a personal services contract with the intention that Ismail would become an ambassador for Canadian football. Ismail would have 64 receptions, 1,300 receiving yards, and 9 touchdowns.

Preseason

Regular season
Matt Dunigan became the Argonauts new quarterback. Dunigan would miss 10 out of 18 regular season games due to injury. The injuries included a pulled groin, pulled hamstring, and pulled calf muscle. In the Eastern final, Dunigan would break his collarbone in two places before halftime.
The Argonauts attendance improved from 30,500 to 37,120 fans per game. Despite winning the Grey Cup and the increase in attendance, the Argonauts lost three million dollars.

Standings

Player stats

Passing

Schedule

 † Canadian Football Hall of Fame Game

Postseason

Grey Cup

 During Grey Cup week, Raghib Ismail embarrassed the team by not showing up to the Meet the Players breakfast.
 Despite numerous injuries, Matt Dunigan would throw two touchdowns in the final quarter to lead the Argonauts to victory.

Toronto Argonauts (36) – TDs, Ed Berry, Darrell K. Smith, Raghib "Rocket" Ismail, Paul Masotti; FGs Lance Chomyc (2); cons., Chomyc (4); singles Chomyc (2).

Calgary Stampeders (21) – TDs, Danny Barrett, Allen Pitts; FGs, Mark McLoughlin (2); cons., McLoughlin (2); single. McLoughlin.

First Quarter
TOR – TD Berry 50 yard interception return (Chomyc convert)
CGY – TD Barrett 1 yard run (McLoughlin convert)
TOR – Single by Chomyc

Second Quarter
TOR – FG Chomyc
CGY – FG McLoughlin

Third Quarter
CGY – Single McLoughlin
TOR – Single Chomyc
CGY – FG McLoughlin
TOR – TD Smith 48 yard pass from Dunigan (Chomyc convert)

Fourth Quarter
TOR – FG Chomyc
CGY – TD Pitts 12 yard pass from Barrett (McLoughlin convert)
TOR – TD Ismail 87 yard kickoff return (Chomyc convert)
TOR – TD Masotti 36 yard pass from Dunigan (Chomyc convert)

Awards and honours
 CFL's Coach of the Year – Adam Rita
 Grey Cup Most Valuable Player, Raghib Ismail

1991 CFL All-Stars
 WR – Raghib "Rocket" Ismail, CFL All-Star
 OG – Dan Ferrone, CFL All-Star
 DT – Harold Hallman, CFL All-Star
 DE – Mike Campbell, CFL All-Star
 LB – Darryl Ford, CFL All-Star
 DB – Don Wilson, CFL All-Star
 P – Hank Ilesic, CFL All-Star
 K – Lance Chomyc, CFL All-Star

References

External links
 Toronto Argonauts official site
 Friends of the Argonauts (Official fanclub of the Toronto Argonauts)
 Argonauts forum at cfl.ca 
 History of the Toronto Argonauts to World War I
 Argonotes, the Toronto Argonauts Band site

Toronto Argonauts seasons
James S. Dixon Trophy championship seasons
Grey Cup championship seasons